Zions Bank Stadium is a soccer-specific stadium in Herriman, Utah, United States, with a seating capacity of 5,000. The stadium is home to Real Monarchs, a MLS Next Pro team affiliated with Real Salt Lake of Major League Soccer, and the Utah Warriors, a Major League Rugby team. The stadium is part of the $78 million Zions Bank Real Academy, which includes the academy and training facilities for Real Salt Lake, and is near the Mountain View Corridor. It was originally scheduled to open on March 31, 2018, but moved back to April after construction delays. In May 2017, Real Salt Lake and Zions Bank announced a sponsorship deal that would give the bank naming rights to the stadium.

Facilities

Zions Bank Stadium is a 5,000-seat stadium at the center of the Zions Bank Real Academy, a  sports campus in Herriman, Utah. The pitch measures , the same dimensions as Rio Tinto Stadium (the home of Real Salt Lake), and uses a Greenfields MX artificial surface. The east side includes a press box, an owners suite, and hospitality spaces on the east side of the pitch. The stadium's roof has  of solar panels that provide 166 kW of electricity.

History

Real Salt Lake chose Herriman as the site of the stadium and academy in early 2016. The club had previously considered options in the West Valley City area and planned an 8,000-seat stadium at the Utah State Fairpark until negotiations in the state government fell apart. Construction began in August 2016 and the academy's charter school opened in August 2017. The charter school, built to serve players and residents of nearby areas, focuses on a STEM curriculum and includes an on-site dormitory. Real Salt Lake and Real Monarchs began using the indoor training facilities in January 2018, replacing preseason camps held in California and Arizona.

Under state laws, the license cannot be issued to businesses whose entrance is within  of a school. In response, Real Salt Lake relocated the entrance to the northwest corner, at a cost of $250,000, and received a license from the state liquor commission. The stadium also features a 166-kilowatt array of solar panels on its roof.

The first sporting event at the stadium, a Utah Warriors match against the Prairie Wolf Pack, took place on April 20 and was attended by 3,143 people. Real Monarchs played their first home match on April 30, a scoreless draw against Las Vegas Lights FC that was attended by 4,065 spectators.

Other events

Soccer

In June and July 2020, Zions Bank Stadium and Rio Tinto Stadium hosted the 2020 NWSL Challenge Cup, a special competition to begin the National Women's Soccer League's 2020 season after it was delayed due to the COVID-19 pandemic. Zions Bank Stadium hosted the competition's early rounds, with play moving to Rio Tinto Stadium for the semifinals and final.

Lacrosse

The 2020 season of the Premier Lacrosse League was moved to Zions Bank Stadium, with the Championship Series played in July and August. The teams and support staff were housed at the Real Salt Lake Training Academy under quarantine.

References

Major League Rugby stadiums
Utah Warriors
Soccer venues in Utah
Rugby union stadiums in Salt Lake City
Sports venues in Utah
USL Championship stadiums
Sports venues completed in 2018
2018 establishments in Utah
Premier Lacrosse League venues
Lacrosse venues in the United States